The Roehampton trophy is the oldest polo trophy in the United Kingdom. The trophy was first played for at the Roehampton Club in 1902 and was won by Buccaneers. Today it is played for at the Ham Polo Club, the tournament is played for at an 6-goal level and the finals are held in August.

History 

The Roehampton Cup is the oldest cup still played for in the United Kingdom, the earliest date on its plinth is the season of 1902 and it was the premier trophy at the Roehampton Polo Club until its demise in 1955. The Trophy itself was donated by Mrs Alison Cunninghame of Craigends upon the opening of the Roehampton Club in 1902.

Roehampton, before the great war, was one of eight metropolitan clubs and the third largest, with over 300 playing members and 550 non-playing members. Those were the days in which an estimated 10,000 polo ponies were stabled in and around London during the season and Roehampton, with Hurlingham and Ranelagh, was the base for one of the three Open Championships of the time.

The Roehampton Cup has seen some notable holders. In 1911, for example, the trophy was won by Comte Johnnie de Madre's Tigers Team, who wore pure silk shirts, hand embroidered with gold thread. Lord Rocksavage and Captain J. F. Harrison (after whom the Harrison Cup at Cowdray was later named) were among the old Etonian winners in 1914, while in 1925 a high powered Argentine team, La Pampa, led by Jack Nelson was victorious.

Eric Horace Tyrrell-Martin, who was to play in the International Polo Cup final 1939, was in the winning team in 1934 and 1935; whilst J. F. Harrison, by then a Major, won the Cup for a second time for 'The Pandas' in the last pre war tournament at the club.

Suitably, as it was to turn out, Ham Polo Club newly revived by Billy Walsh, won the cup in the first post-war tournament of 1947. Later names engraved on the trophy include some of the leading players of their day; among them Peter W. Dollar, Alec Harper, Haunut Sing, Heskie Baig, Charles Smith-Ryland, John Lankin and Humphrey Patrick Guinness.

Following the closure of the Roehampton Polo Club, Edward Tauchert, then player at Ham Polo Club arranged for the Roehampton Golf Club to kindly donate the trophy to Ham Polo Club where it has remained ever since. It became a popular trophy at Ham and in the 1990s through the efforts of John O'Driscoll the Roehampton was reintroduced as a Tournament.

The Tournament Today

From 2008 until 2015 the League stages of the tournament were being played at Ali Albwardy's private polo grounds in Windsor, the base of Dubai Polo Team. The finals though were still held at Ham Polo Club on the Number One ground. From 2016 onwards the early games have been held at the Black Bears grounds in Henley-upon-Thames with the finals day still taking place at Ham Polo Club

In 2012, the 110th year of the competition, a sponsorship deal was signed with Bang and Olufsen of Kingston with the tournament becoming known as the 'Roehampton Trophy brought to you by Bang and Olufsen of Kingston'. In 2015, 2016 and 2017 sponsorship was taken on by London Square, the developers behind the restoration of the Royal Star and Garter Home, Richmond. In 2020 the title sponsorship was taken by Fabergé.

The Roehampton takes place in late August to avoid overlapping with HPA Victor Ludorum tournaments played at the same handicap.

Winners 

Not counting the years of the two world wars when polo ceased in England, there are 35 years missing from the commemorative plinth. The recorded winners are as follows.

The Trophy 

The Silver Trophy itself, donated by Mrs Alison Cunninghame of Craigends, stands 53 cm high. The cup is detachable from the base section, this has caused trouble with over excited winning teams at presentations and as a result the trophy has a slight lean. The trophy also has a detachable lid though it has not been traditional in recent years to drink champagne from the trophy as a celebration.

Under the handles of the Trophy are the faces of two polo players wearing polo hats with wings, the trophy also bears an unhidden Hallmark on its front.

Not including the years that Britain was at war and the trophy was not played for, there are 35 years missing from the base including 1947, the first year it was won by Ham Polo Club.

References 

 
1902 establishments in England
1902 in London
Polo in the United Kingdom
Roehampton
Sport in the London Borough of Richmond upon Thames